Zoológico Benito Juárez is a zoo that's located in Morelia. It has a wide variety of animals such as big cats, bears, primates, hoofstock etc.

External links
 http://zoomorelia.com/

Zoos in Mexico
Articles needing infobox zoo